Box Elder (Lakota: čhaŋšúška; "box elder maple") is a city in Pennington and Meade counties in the State of South Dakota. The population was 11,746 according to the 2020 census, making it the 11th most populous city in South Dakota.  Ellsworth Air Force Base lies on the northeast side of the city.

Box Elder was named from nearby Boxelder Creek.

Geography
Box Elder is located at  (44.115349, -103.081997).

Box Elder has been assigned the ZIP code 57719 and the FIPS place code 06620. It is located within minutes of Ellsworth AFB, and surrounds it on three sides.

Climate

Demographics

2010 census
At the 2010 census there were 7,800 people, 2,443 households, and 1,968 families living in the city. The racial makeup of the city was 79.5% White, 5.1% African American, 4.4% Native American, 2.2% Asian, 0.4% Pacific Islander, 2.4% from other races, and 6.0% from two or more races. Hispanic or Latino of any race were 7.9%.

Of the 2,443 households, 55.2% had children under the age of 18 living with them, 60.6% were married couples living together, 14.1% had a female householder with no husband present, 5.8% had a male householder with no wife present, and 19.4% were non-families. 15.1% of households were one person, and 2% were one person aged 65 or older. The average household size was 2.95 and the average family size was 3.26.

The median age was 23.5 years. 33.6% of residents were under the age of 18; 20.4% were between the ages of 18 and 24; 30.3% were from 25 to 44; 13% were from 45 to 64, and 2.9% were 65 or older. The gender makeup of the city was 51.9% male and 48.1% female.

2000 census
At the 2000 census, there were 2,841 people, 993 households, and 750 families living in the city. The population density was 489.6 inhabitants per square mile (189.1/km). There were 1,072 housing units at an average density of 184.8 per square mile (71.4/km). The racial makeup of the city was 83.42% White, 2.29% African American, 5.60% Native American, 2.08% Asian, 0.11% Pacific Islander, 0.70% from other races, and 5.81% from two or more races. Hispanic or Latino of any race were 3.56% of the population.

Of the 993 households, 48.0% had children under the age of 18 living with them, 50.4% were married couples living together, 19.6% had a female householder with no husband present, and 24.4% were non-families. 17.3% of households were one person, and 1.8% were one person aged 65 or older. The average household size was 2.86 and the average family size was 3.20.

The age distribution was 34.6% under the age of 18, 13.1% from 18 to 24, 30.9% from 25 to 44, 18.2% from 45 to 64, and 3.3% 65 or older. The median age was 26 years. For every 100 females, there were 98.9 males. For every 100 females age 18 and over, there were 95.7 males.

The median household income was $32,344 and the median family income  was $35,020. Males had a median income of $24,596 versus $17,313 for females. The per capita income for the city was $12,692. About 13.0% of families and 15.9% of the population were below the poverty line, including 21.3% of those under age 18 and 6.9% of those aged 65 or over.

Schools
Douglas School District serves families in Box Elder and those living on Ellsworth AFB. The school district operates six schools in Box Elder:
Carrousel (Pre-Kindergarten)
Badger Clark Elementary (Kindergarten - 3rd grade)
Francis Case Elementary (Kindergarten - 3rd grade)
Vandenberg Elementary (4th - 5th grade)
Douglas Middle School (6th - 8th grade)
Douglas High School (9th - 12th grade)
The school's athletics teams are the Douglas Patriots.

Points of interest
 South Dakota Air and Space Museum

Notable people
Jeffrey W. Hayzlett, author, speaker, businessman
Nellie Zabel Willhite, first deaf woman to earn a pilot's license

References

Cities in South Dakota
Cities in Meade County, South Dakota
Cities in Pennington County, South Dakota
Rapid City, South Dakota metropolitan area